Enterprise journalism reporting that is not generated by news or a press release, but rather generated by a reporter or news organization based on developed sources.  Tied to "shoe-leather" reporting and "beat reporting," enterprise journalism gets the journalist out of the office and away from the traditional news makers.  It also enlists some of the traditional traits of good investigative reporting, such as reading documents.

Enterprise journalism does not involve reporting which is based purely on press releases or news conferences. On the other hand, this kind of reporting involves stories where a reporter unearths a story on his/her own; a lot of people refer to these as ‘scoops.'  The enterprise reporting goes ahead of just reporting events; it discovers the forces that shape such events.

References

External links
 Enterprise journalism is not a commodity
 Making enterprise journalism “web reader” friendly
 Enterprise Journalism on Facebook

Types of journalism
Journalism terminology